The George Washington University Hospital is a for-profit hospital in Washington, D.C., affiliated with the George Washington University School of Medicine and Health Sciences.  Since 1997, the George Washington University Hospital has been jointly owned and operated by a partnership between a subsidiary of Universal Health Services and the George Washington University.

The current 400,000 sq ft (37,200 m2) facility opened on August 23, 2002. It has 371 beds, holds more than $45 million of medical equipment, and cost over $96 million to construct.  The hospital is licensed by the District of Columbia Department of Consumer and Regulatory Affairs and accredited by the U.S. Joint Commission.

History
Founded in 1824 as a medical department in Columbian College (now called the George Washington University), the GW Medical School was the 11th in the nation and the first in the nation's capital.
 1824 The first GW medical department was located in downtown Washington, D.C., on 10th and E Streets near Ford's Theatre. In the 1840s, it moved into a larger building at Judiciary Square as an infirmary, which subsequently became the first general hospital in the nation's capital.
 1853 When the GW Infirmary was enlarged to allow the curriculum to formally include clinical studies, which meant that the college became one of the first in the nation to teach clinical medicine.
 1861 The infirmary was reclaimed by the government for use as a military hospital for Civil War casualties, and was destroyed by fire shortly thereafter.
 1863 The medical college reopened, post-fire, in the Constitution Office on E Street.
 1868 The hospital and medical school are moved to the former location of the Army Medical Museum's specimens, 1335 H Street.
 1904 The Columbian University Medical School and Hospital were rededicated The George Washington University Medical School and Hospital. At this time, the faculty boasted many of the nation's most prominent doctors, including Major Walter Reed, who identified the mosquito as the carrier of yellow fever; Dr. Theobald Smith, whose pioneering research identifying germs as the cause of diseases changed the course of medicine; and Dr. Frederick Russell, who introduced typhoid vaccine into the Army.
 1928 The Department of Medicine became the School of Medicine, the School of Nursing, and the University Hospital.
 1948 The GW Hospital moves to Foggy Bottom at 901 23rd Street (directly across from present location) and housed 501 patient beds. At the time of its dedication, it was the largest private building in the District of Columbia.
 1981 President Ronald Reagan rushed to GW's Emergency Department after an assassination attempt, suffering from gunshot wounds in the chest and in the lower right arm. The center is later renamed for Reagan, who survived.
 1996 The GW Medical Faculty Associates' mobile mammography program aims to make life-saving early detection of breast cancer possible for all women in D.C., regardless of their ability to pay. This vital program is still being offered today.
 1997 Universal Health Services buys an 80% stake in the hospital and takes over day-to-day operations from the university
 2002 GW Hospital moves across the street to 900 23rd Street, NW. The 371-bed facility is the first new hospital in D.C. in over 20 years.
 2019 GW Hospital opens their new rooftop helipad constructed on the existing hospital facility that originally opened in 2002. The approval for this to be added required overturning an existing DC law which had been in place since the 1980's that prohibited the construction of any new helipads within the District. The newly revised law allows for Level I Trauma Centers to construct and operate these facilities. The helipad is used by private companies such as PHI and STAT Medevac for transfers of critically ill patients from outside hospitals in need of specialty trauma, cardiac, or neurologic care. Critical trauma patients may also be transported directly from accident scenes by United States Park Police Eagle helicopters or Maryland State Police that operate EMS medevac flights within the DC region.

Services

Emergency medicine
At George Washington University, the Ronald Reagan Institute of Emergency Medicine was established in 1991. The department cares for nearly 85,000 patients each year, including serious injuries, as a level 1 trauma center.
  
GW's emergency department consists of:
 52 emergency department beds
 2 trauma bays
 6 critical care stabilization bays
 5 negative-pressure isolation rooms
 12 fast-track treatment rooms

Center for trauma and critical care

The George Washington University Hospital is an ACS verified level I trauma centerGWUH receives the most critically-injured trauma patients from Washington, D.C. and the Northern Virginia area, as well as hospital transfers from Maryland, Virginia, and West Virginia.  In 2018, the hospital was approved to construct a helipad after a many year battle to change a DC law prohibiting the construction of new helipads. The addition of this ability to receive helicopters greatly shortens the time needed to transfer critically ill patients from another hospital, or directly from an emergency scene, to receive the highest level of care for critically ill patients.

Cardiovascular center
GWUH is home to a comprehensive program for advanced treatment of heart disease and vascular disorders, noninvasive diagnostics, 24-hour interventional cardiologist and cath lab, cardiac catheterization, heart rhythm disorders and treatments and cardiovascular surgery.

Comprehensive stroke center

GWUH is home to a comprehensive stroke center offering 24-hour acute stroke services treating ischemic strokes, hemorrhagic strokes, and subarachnoid hemorrhages. Coverage for acute endovascular treatments, neurosurgical procedures, and thrombolytics is provided around the clock. Stroke care is provided via a team-based approach with teams composed of vascular neurologists, neurointerventionalists, neurosurgeons, intensivists, neuroradiologists, physiatrists, and other specialists as determined by patient requirements. GW hospital houses an acute rehabilitation unit, thus allowing stroke victims to receive all of their care in one location.

Leadership
Kimberly Russo, MS was appointed chief executive officer of the George Washington University Hospital June 2016. Prior to this appointment, she served the as chief operating officer for the hospital since April 2009. She also previously served as executive director of rehabilitation services. She holds an MBA from the University of Nebraska-Lincoln, through a collaborative leadership program with Gallup, a Master of Science in speech language pathology from Rush University in Chicago, Illinois, and a Bachelor of Science in speech language pathology and audiology from Illinois State University.

Nicole Dollison has been the chief operating officer since January 2017. Prior to that, she served as chief operating officer at Manatee Memorial Hospital in Florida. She holds a Master of Public Health Administration from the University of Nebraska-Omaha.

Bruno Petinaux, MD has been the chief medical officer at GW Hospital since June 2017. He has also served as an emergency room physician at the hospital and is an associate professor in the department of emergency medicine at the GW School of Medicine and Health Sciences.

George Sprinkel was appointed chief financial officer in October 2015. Before joining GW Hospital, Sprinkel was the chief financial officer at Gateway Medical Center in Tennessee and other hospitals. He has a Master of Business Administration from the University of North Carolina at Wilmington.

Peggy Norton-Rosko has been the chief nursing officer since June 2018. Before GW Hospital, she was the senior vice president/system chief nursing officer at Centegra Health System. She has a doctorate of Nursing Practice from Chamberlain University.

References

Hospitals in Washington, D.C.
Hospital
Hospitals established in 1824
Hospital buildings completed in 1948
Hospital buildings completed in 2002
1824 establishments in Washington, D.C.
Attempted assassination of Ronald Reagan
Trauma centers